Rolando Andaya Highway, officially known as Quirino Highway and also known as Camarines Sur–Quezon Road, is a national primary highway located in the provinces of Camarines Norte, Quezon, and Camarines Sur in the Philippines. It serves as an alternative route to the Pan-Philippine Highway and has been efficiently used as a major highway since the 1990s. It traverses the municipality of Santa Elena in Camarines Norte, municipalities of Sipocot, Lupi, Ragay, and Del Gallego in Camarines Sur, and the municipalities of Tagkawayan, Guinayangan, and Calauag in Quezon. It is primarily known as Andaya Highway in segments within Camarines Sur and likewise called as Quirino Highway within Camarines Norte and Quezon.

The entire highway is designated as National Route 68  (N68) of the Philippine highway network.

History 

The construction of the highway began in around the 1950s, during the term of President Elpidio Quirino, thus being called Quirino Highway. Being discontinuous for decades, it was funded in 1976 by virtue of Presidential Decree No. 759 by President Ferdinand Marcos. The plan for the road was to connect the town of Del Gallego, native Ragay (southwestern Ragay), and Ragay Port, all in Camarines Sur, to the Maharlika Highway. The highway opened in 1984. Between 1992 and 1999, it was extended to Sipocot, Camarines Sur.

In 2004, an entire segment within Camarines Sur was renamed to Rolando R. Andaya Highway, in honor of the late representative from the province, by virtue of Republic Act No. 9234.

Route description 
Andaya Highway or Quirino Highway starts at its intersection with Maharlika Highway in Santa Elena, Camarines Norte. It then enters the province of Quezon and traverses the towns of Calauag, Guinayangan, and Tagkawayan, where it bypasses its municipal center. It re-enters Bicol Region, this time at Camarines Sur and traverses Del Gallego, Ragay, Lupi, and Sipocot, where it ends and reunites with Maharlika Highway. Thus, the highway serves as a shorter and alternative route to Maharlika Highway, which traverses the northern part of Camarines Norte and Camarines Sur.

Intersections

References 

Official Site of the Diocese of Libmanan
Philippine Standard Geographic Code
2000 Philippine Census Information
2007 Philippine Census Information
Official Site of the Province of Camarines Sur
Unofficial Site of the Municipality of Tagkawayan, Quezon
Local Governance Performance Management System

Roads in Quezon
Transportation in Camarines Norte
Roads in Camarines Sur
Roads in Camarines Norte